Digital Works is an album by American jazz pianist Ahmad Jamal featuring performances digitally recorded in 1985 and released on the Atlantic label.

Critical reception
Scott Yanow of Allmusic calls the album, "Good music overall, but not essential".

Track listing
 "Poinciana" (Buddy Bernier, Nat Simon) – 8:26 
 "But Not for Me" (George Gershwin, Ira Gershwin) – 3:33 
 "Midnight Sun" (Sonny Burke, Lionel Hampton, Johnny Mercer) – 3:20 
 "Footprints" (Wayne Shorter) – 5:13 
 "Once Upon a Time" (Lee Adams, Charles Strouse) – 3:17 
 "One" (Sigidi Abdullah) – 7:16 
 "La Costa" (Natalie Cole, Linda Williams) – 5:22 
 "Misty" (Johnny Burke, Erroll Garner) – 3:58 
 "Theme From M*A*S*H" (Mike Altman, Johnny Mandel) – 6:30 
 "Biencavo" (Ahmad Jamal) – 4:27 
 "Time for Love" (Johnny Mandel, Paul Francis Webster) – 6:39 
 "Wave" (Antônio Carlos Jobim) – 5:22

Personnel
Ahmad Jamal – piano, keyboards
Larry Ball – bass
Herlin Riley – drums 
Iraj Lashkary – percussion

References 

Atlantic Records albums
Ahmad Jamal albums
1985 albums